Michiel Elijzen (born 31 August 1982 in Culemborg, Gelderland) is a Dutch former professional road bicycle racer, who retired from competition after the 2010 season to become a sporting director for , the team for which he last rode competitively. He now works as a directeur sportif for the Sunweb Group B.V. teams: UCI WorldTeam , UCI Women's WorldTeam , and UCI Continental team .

Major results

2005
 3rd Time trial, National Road Championships
2007
 1st Duo Normand (with Bradley Wiggins)
 1st Prologue Eneco Tour
 2nd Time trial, National Road Championships

References

External links

1982 births
Living people
People from Culemborg
Dutch male cyclists
Cyclists from Gelderland
20th-century Dutch people
21st-century Dutch people